Jonathan Anderson is a Northern Irish fashion designer and the founder of JW Anderson. Anderson is known for his eponymous label and having served as the creative director of Spanish luxury house LOEWE.

Early life
Anderson was born in the town of Magherafelt in Northern Ireland in 1984. He is the son of Willie Anderson, who played international rugby for Ireland between 1984 and 1990. His mother Heather Buckley worked as a secondary school teacher.

Anderson grew up in Northern Ireland, but spent a lot of time on the Balearic island of Ibiza, where his parents owned a house. He has since stated in interviews that the contrasting environments played a big role in shaping his sensibilities as a designer. When he was in primary school, he was diagnosed with severe dyslexia.

At the age of 18 Anderson moved to the United States in an attempt to become an actor. He was based in New York at The Juilliard School, but developed an interest in costume design rather than acting. He moved to Dublin shortly after, securing his first fashion-based job at the department store Brown Thomas.

Anderson later moved to London, graduating from the London College of Fashion in 2005.

Career
Anderson began his career working as a visual merchandiser for Prada, working for Manuela Pavesi. He launched his own menswear collection shortly after in 2008. His first collection under the JW Anderson label received critical acclaim. In 2010, Anderson received sponsorship from the British Fashion Council's Newton committee and subsequently produced his first catwalk collection at London Fashion Week.

The rising success of his JW Anderson label allowed him to secure a second NewGen sponsorship and led to a collaboration with high-street retailer Topshop in 2012. The collaboration was a collection of limited-edition items, known as the JW Anderson x Topshop collection. It featured clothing and accessories ranging from mini-kilts and paisley prints, to Halloween motifs and included a range of stationery, iPhone cases and Rubik cubes. The collection sold out within hours of it launching. Anderson and Topshop scheduled another collaboration to launch a year later, with the release coming in February 2013.

Later that year, Donatella Versace enlisted him to replace Christopher Kane at Versace's diffusive line Versus, where he showcased his first collection in June at New York's Lexington Armoury. 

In September 2013, LVMH took a minority stake in JW Anderson and named Anderson as the new creative director for Spanish luxury house LOEWE. By 2019, he created 18 different collections each year — six for his own label, 10 for Loewe and two for his ongoing collaborations with Uniqlo.

In February 2023, Anderson designed singer Rihanna's red outfit, which she used to announce her second pregnancy during her half-time Super Bowl performance.

Other activities 
 Victoria and Albert Museum, Member of the Board of Trustees (since 2019)

Personal life
Anderson is openly gay. He lives in Paris and London, with regular visits to LOEWE's Madrid headquarters. He also maintains a weekend home in Norfolk.

Awards and honors

References

Living people
British fashion designers
1984 births
LGBT fashion designers
Menswear designers